EM Legend  (EML) (Chinese: 峨眉传奇; pinyin: Éméi Chuánqí), is a Kickboxing and Muaythai fight promotion headquartered in Chengdu, Sichuan Province, China.  

The first event was held in Emei, China on June 6, 2014.   In the first 5 years, EML organized more than 42 fighting events in China, Great Britain, New Zealand, Hungary and Thailand.   EML has also co-hosted events with other promotions like Topking World Series, Thai Fight, King in the Ring, Superfight Series and Superfight Series Hungary.     

In 2020, EML organized three main fighting events, EM Legend 42 - Lingfen Station on January 5, EM Legend -  Kangding Station on September 26, and then EM Legend 43 - Guanghan Station on November 28. The second event was held in Kangding (Chinese: 康定), a city located in the eastern part of the Gangzi Tibetan Autonomous Prefecture in Sichuan Province.

Events

References 

Kickboxing organizations
Professional Muay Thai organizations
Sports organizations of China
Organizations based in Chengdu